Mwyngloddfa Nantiago is a Site of Special Scientific Interest in Brecknock, Powys, Wales. It is located on the eastern flank of the Plynlimon range of mountains. The spoil tips at the disused mine display examples of mineralisation.

See also
List of Sites of Special Scientific Interest in Brecknock

References

Sites of Special Scientific Interest in Brecknock